The Lanzas Chilenos (Spanish for "Chilean spears"), sometimes referred to as Lanzas Internacionales, is a criminal gang operating from Chile. Its members originated as proficient pickpockets, and most of them were born in poor Chilean neighbourhoods. The gang of thieves has been described as "very professional", with the FBI and Scotland Yard referring to its members as "the best thieves in the world".

According to Chilean journalist Eduardo Labarca(es), who wrote three books about the gang, it was active as early as the 1940s and 1950s. He further describes the gang members as "masters of disguise", dressing up and faking accents to effortlessly blend in with certain groups in society. However, he notes that the gang's younger generation is notably more violent and bold. Lanzas Chilenos is active in Spain, the Netherlands, Germany, Austria and France.

References

Street gangs
Gangs in Austria
Gangs in Chile
Gangs in France
Gangs in Germany
Gangs in the Netherlands
Gangs in Spain